In the Methodist Church of Great Britain, deacons (a term used for both men and women) are members of an order called the Methodist Diaconal Order (MDO). The MDO is both a religious order and an order of ministry (or in other words, an order of clerics regular). One distinctive feature of the Methodist ecclesiology is that a deacon has a permanent ministry and remains as a deacon – it is not a transitional step toward becoming a presbyter. The diaconate is seen as an equal but offering something different from that of the presbyteral ministry.

Currently the order reports to have about 280 deacons, who follow a common Rule of Life.

History

Wesleyan Deaconesses and the Wesley Deaconess Order were founded by the Rev. Thomas Bowman Stephenson in 1890. Deaconesses began to work overseas from 1894 following a request for a deaconess to serve in South Africa. 

In the 20th century, the diaconate was restored as a vocational order in many Western churches. Deacons were recognised as an order equal to presbyters. Accordingly, the Methodist Conference of 1998 admitted all existing members of the Methodist Diaconal Order into "full connexion"—becoming ordained to a full-time, life-long ministry.

Form of address
Formerly, deaconesses were addressed as Sister, but since the admission of men to the order, and once it became an order of ministry as well as a religious order, all members are now officially titled "Deacon". The term "deaconess" is no longer used.

Habit
There is no formal habit or uniform for a Methodist deacon: some deacons may decide to wear what is regarded as 'traditional dress' for the MDO – a navy blue suit and a white shirt of blouse, particularly for formal occasions, while others may feel that they would prefer to wear the polo shirts and sweat shirts commissioned by the MDO particularly if the circumstances are less formal. Deacons are permitted to wear clerical shirts; however, these must be navy blue or white and deacons must wear the diaconal order badge they were presented with at their Ordination.

Deacons are presented with a pectoral cross at their ordination. The cross of the MDO is an important identifier for Methodist deacons.

Footnotes

References

External links
The Diaconal Order – The Methodist Church website

Diaconal order